Ma Rainey's Black Bottom is a 1982 play – one of the ten-play Pittsburgh Cycle by August Wilson, and the only one not set in Pittsburgh – that chronicles the 20th-century African-American experience.  The play is set in a recording studio in 1920s Chicago, and deals with issues of race, art, religion, and the historic exploitation of Black recording artists by white producers.

The play's title comes from Ma Rainey's song of the same name, which refers to the Black Bottom dance. Rainey, whose life as a well-known blues-singer of the 1920s is an inspiration for the play, is also the titular character.

Ma Rainey's Black Bottom was published in the early 1980s and premiered at the Eugene O'Neill Theater Center. Its Broadway debut at the Cort Theatre in 1984 won a New York Drama Critics' Circle award and garnered a Tony Award nomination for Best Play.

Plot
In a Chicago recording studio in 1927, Ma Rainey's band players Cutler, Toledo, Slow Drag, and Levee gather to record a new album of her songs. As they wait for her to arrive they tell stories, joke, philosophize, and argue. Tension is apparent between the young hot-headed trumpeter Levee, who dreams of having his own band, and veterans Cutler and Toledo.

By the time Ma Rainey arrives with entourage in tow, recording has fallen badly behind schedule, enraging producers Sturdyvant and Irvin. Ma's insistence that her stuttering nephew Sylvester speak the title song's introduction wreaks further havoc. As the band waits for various technical problems to be solved, Levee and Cutler come to blows. Levee is then simultaneously fired by Ma for his uncompromising behavior, and rejected by producer Sturdyvant when he tries to get his own record deal. In a rage, Levee fatally stabs Toledo, destroying any possibility of a future for himself.

Productions
The play had its first staged reading in 1982 at the Eugene O'Neill Theater Center in Waterford, Connecticut. The four main members of the cast -- Charles S. Dutton as Levee, Joe Seneca as Cutler, Leonard Jackson as Slow Drag, and Robert Judd as Toledo—almost immediately developed a very strong sense of ensemble. At that time, the best-known actor in the cast was Theresa Merritt, who played Ma.

Direction was by Lloyd Richards, one of August Wilson's most frequent collaborators. Richards and Wilson worked together for almost two years on the play. It opened at the Yale Repertory Theater in April 1984, and then moved to Broadway's Cort Theatre. The show opened on October 11, 1984, and show ran for 276 performances. It received a 1985 Tony Award nomination for Best Play; Dutton and Merritt were nominated for acting awards. The production was recorded and released by Manhattan Records.

It was first performed in the UK at the Royal National Theatre in London in 1989 in a production by Howard Davies starring Clarke Peters and Hugh Quarshie as Toledo and Levee. It was enormously well received.

A Broadway revival opened on February 6, 2003, at the Royale Theatre, featuring Charles S. Dutton as Levee and Whoopi Goldberg as Ma.  Directed by Marion McClinton, the show ran for 68 performances.

Subsequent UK revivals have taken place in Liverpool at the Playhouse starring Melanie La Barrie as Ma and Cornelius Macarthy as Levee (2004, direction: Gemma Bodinetz) and the Manchester Royal Exchange Theatre in a production starring Antonio Fargas as Toledo, Ram John Holder as Slow Drag, and Johnnie Fiori as Ma (2006, direction: Jacob Murray).

In 2016 the National Theatre in London revived the show to great critical acclaim, garnering a Laurence Olivier award for best revival. The production starred O-T Fagbenle as Levee and Sharon D. Clarke as Ma Rainey.

In 2020, a film adaptation by screenwriter Ruben Santiago-Hudson and director George C. Wolfe, starring Viola Davis and Chadwick Boseman, was released.

Cast and characters

Awards and nominations

Original Broadway production

2003 Broadway revival

2016 West End revival

References

Further reading

External links
 
 
 

1982 plays
American plays adapted into films
Broadway plays
New York Drama Critics' Circle Award winners
Chicago in fiction
The Pittsburgh Cycle
Plays set in the 1920s
Plays set in Illinois
Grammy Award for Best Spoken Word Album